Nualphan Lamsam (born 21 March 1966), nicknamed Madame Pang, is the President and Chief Executive Officer of Muang Thai Insurance, as well as the team manager of the Thailand national football team and the chairwoman of Port F.C.

She is a member of the Democrat Party and was its assistant secretary general from 2006 to 2016.

Family and education 
Nualphan is the fifth generation descendant of the Lamsam family. She is the daughter of Photipong Lamsam, a politician of the Democrat Party and Yupa Lamsam, a major shareholder of  MuangThai Insurance public company limited, the company which she currently owns.

She has a sister, Wannaporn Phornprapa, who is the Managing Director of P Landscape Company and a brother, Sara Lamsam, who is the President and CEO of Mueang Thai Life Insurance .

Nualphan's first marriage was with Dr. Vachara Phanchet, Chairman of Sittipol Sales co. and German Auto co. They had one daughter, Nuanwan Phanchet. Nualphan and Dr. Vachara divorced in early 2005. Nualphan later married Police Colonel Narat Sawettananas on 19 January 2014.

Nualphan graduated from Patumwan Demonstration School, Srinakharinwirot University, Bachelor of Marketing, Faculty of Commerce and Accountancy in Chulalongkorn University and a Master of Management in Boston University.

References

1966 births
Living people
Nualphan Lamsam
Nualphan Lamsam
Nualphan Lamsam
20th-century businesswomen
Nualphan Lamsam
Boston University School of Management alumni
Nualphan Lamsam